The American Academy of Actuaries, also known as the Academy, is the body that represents and unites United States actuaries in all practice areas. Established in 1965, the Academy serves as the profession's voice on public policy and professionalism issues.

Standards
The Academy, in 1988, created the Actuarial Standards Board (ASB) as an independent entity, supported by AAA staff. The ASB serves as the single board promulgating standards of practice for the entire actuarial profession in the United States. The ASB was given sole authority to develop, obtain comment upon, revise, and adopt standards of practice for the actuarial profession.

Membership requirements
In order to sign statements of actuarial opinion, an American actuary must be a Member, American Academy of Actuaries (M.A.A.A.). The Academy membership requirements are:
Membership in one of the following societies:
Associate or Fellow of the Casualty Actuarial Society.
Associate or Fellow of the Society of Actuaries.
M.S.P.A. or F.S.P.A. in the American Society of Pension Professionals and Actuaries.
Conference of Consulting Actuaries.
Enrolled Actuary status under Title 3, Section C of the Employee Retirement Income Security Act of 1974.
Fellowship in the Canadian Institute of Actuaries.
Fellowship in the Faculty of Actuaries in Scotland.
Fellowship in the Institute of Actuaries in Great Britain.
Membership in the Colegio Nacional de Actuarios in Mexico.
Fellowship in the Institute of Actuaries of Australia.
Special approval by the Membership Committee and the executive committee of other actuarial educational credentials.
A resident of the United States for at least three years, or a non-resident or new resident who meets the Academy's education requirements and can prove familiarity with U.S. laws and practices in his or her “actuarial practice area.”

Actuarial Board for Counseling and Discipline 
The Actuarial Board for Counseling and Discipline (ABCD) was formed to serve the academy and all other U.S. actuarial organizations. The ABCD considers complaints and questions concerning possible violations of the Code(s) of Professional Conduct. In addition, the ABCD responds to inquiries by actuaries concerning their professional conduct and, when requested to do so, provides guidance in professional matters.

Public policy activities 
The Academy has published a number of issue briefs and monographs addressing public policy issues from an actuarial point of view.  Because the Academy is non-partisan, it avoids taking specific policy positions in these publications.  Most tend to discuss the fiscal and economic considerations as seen by actuaries.  In many cases several policy alternatives are discussed, and advantages and disadvantages identified for each.  In some cases the Academy provides formal written or oral testimony to Congress or other governmental bodies.  The Academy is often asked by the National Association of Insurance Commissioners (NAIC) to provide input on actuarial issues, and has provided the NAIC with a number of reports and statements.  On occasion, the Academy has submitted amicus briefs on court cases that are of interest to the actuarial profession.  Less formal comment letters and other explanatory materials have been provided to a number of external audiences.

Magazine 
The Academy publishes Contingencies magazine, a bimonthly publication that publishes articles on a wide range of issues related to the actuarial profession.

References

Further reading

External links
American Academy of Actuaries
Actuarial Board for Counseling and Discipline
Actuarial Standards Board
US Actuarial News

Actuarial associations
Professional associations based in the United States
1965 establishments in Washington, D.C.